Crinoline and Romance is a 1923 American silent comedy film directed by Harry Beaumont and starring Viola Dana, Claude Gillingwater, and John Bowers.

Plot
As described in a film magazine, Colonel Charles E. Cavanaugh (Gillingwater) lives in a secluded district of North Carolina with his orphaned granddaughter Emmy Lou (Dana). He has raised her in utter ignorance of life beyond this one spot and she still wears crinolines. The old home of the Cavanaughs is now in the hands of the Colonel's niece, Mrs. Kate Wimbleton, a middle-aged society woman who likes to surround herself with young people. She invites Emmy Lou to visit her but the grandfather refuses, so she sends Davis Jordan (Bowers) to help rescue the niece from her plight. When Jordan finds Emmy Lou, the servants force him off the place. Emmy Lou decides to runaway and visit her aunt. Her old fashioned ideas and costume win over the men and she proves a great success. Then she learns of her grandfather's illness and returns home to be with him. Jordan and Augustus Biddle (Forrest) follow her. Both men are in love with her and she cannot decide which she would like to marry. The bitter feeling between the two leads to a fist fight, and the Colonel decides it would be better settled with pistols in a duel. When Biddle cheats, Emmy Lou has no difficulty in making her choice.

Cast
 Viola Dana as Miss Emmy Lou 
 Claude Gillingwater as Col. Charles E. Cavanaugh 
 John Bowers as Davis Jordan 
 Allan Forrest as Augustus Biddle 
 Betty Francisco as Kitty Biddle 
 Mildred June as Birdie Bevans 
 Lillian Lawrence as Mrs. Kate Wimbleton 
 Gertrude Short as Sibil Vane 
 Lillian Leighton as Abigail 
 Nick Cogley as Uncle Mose

Preservation
Crinoline and Romance is a lost film.

References

Bibliography
 Munden, Kenneth White. The American Film Institute Catalog of Motion Pictures Produced in the United States, Part 1. University of California Press, 1997.

External links

1923 films
1923 comedy films
Silent American comedy films
Films directed by Harry Beaumont
American silent feature films
1920s English-language films
American black-and-white films
Metro Pictures films
1920s American films